The Sidmouth Herald is a British newspaper, established in 1849. A team of reporters cover Sidmouth, Beer, Branscombe, Ottery St Mary, and the surrounding areas.

Owned by Archant publishing, it has sister papers in the county called the Exmouth Journal, the Midweek Herald and the North Devon Gazette.
Also in the South-West are the Weston & Somerset Mercury, the Somerset Mercury and the North Somerset Times.

References

External links
 Official website

Newspapers published in Devon
Publications established in 1849
Weekly newspapers published in the United Kingdom
1849 establishments in England
Sidmouth